Hezwan or Hazwan is a village in northern Aleppo Governorate, northwestern Syria. Nearby localities include Sosyan  to the northeast and Ablah  to the northwest. In the 2004 census, Hezwan had a population of 1,579.

References

Populated places in al-Bab District